Balthasar Augustin Albrecht (1687– 1765) was a German painter.

Life

Albrecht, who was born at Berg, near Aufkirchen in Bavaria, in 1687, was a pupil of Nikolaus Gottfried Stuber, and studied in Venice and Rome. On his return to Germany in 1719, he became popular as an historical painter, and was appointed court-painter and inspector of the Picture Gallery at Munich, where he died in 1765.

References

Sources
 

18th-century German painters
18th-century German male artists
German male painters
1687 births
1765 deaths
People from Starnberg (district)
Court painters

Catholic painters